Richard Jeffrey is an American philosopher.

Richard Jeffrey may also refer to:

Richard Jeffrey (bobsleigh)

See also

Richard Jefferies (disambiguation)